Martin Roček is a professor of theoretical physics at the State University of New York at Stony Brook and a member of the C. N. Yang Institute for Theoretical Physics. He received A.B. and Ph.D. degrees from Harvard University in 1975 and 1979. He did post-doctoral research at the University of Cambridge and Caltech before becoming a professor at Stony Brook University.

He was one of the co-inventors of hyperkähler quotients, a hyperkahler analogue of Marsden–Weinstein reduction and the structure of Bihermitian manifolds.  His research interests include supersymmetry, string theory and applications of generalized complex geometry, and with S. J. Gates, M. T. Grisaru, and W. Siegel, Rocek coauthored Superspace, or One thousand and one lessons in supersymmetry (1984), the first comprehensive book on supersymmetry.

He is the local coordinator of the annual Simons Workshop in Mathematics and Physics jointly hosted by Yang Institute for Theoretical Physics and the Department of Mathematics of the Stony Brook University.

References 

"Twisted multiplets and new supersymmetric nonlinear sigma-models"

External links
Martin Rocek's page at YITP
 5th Simons Workshop in Mathematics and Physics

Living people
Theoretical physicists
String theorists
Stony Brook University faculty
New Trier High School alumni
Harvard University alumni
Year of birth missing (living people)